Rafael Cordero y Molina (October 24, 1790 – July 5, 1868), known as Maestro Cordero, was a self-educated Afro–Puerto Rican who provided free schooling to the children of his city regardless of race or social standing. He is also known as the "Father of Public Education in Puerto Rico".

In 2004, the Catholic Church began the process of Cordero's beatification. In 2013, Pope Francis recognized him as Venerable.

Early years
Cordero was born in San Juan, Puerto Rico, then part of the Viceroyalty of New Spain, into a low-income family. He was one of three children, born to Lucas Cordero and Rita Molina. His two older sisters were Gregoria and Celestina. His father worked in the tobacco fields, while his mother tended the house. Cordero, who was of African ancestry, was self-educated. His love of literature and his determination to teach others and educate himself helped him develop the skills and preparation to teach primary school. Cordero received the sacrament of Confirmation at the age of 14 from Bishop Juan Alejo de Arizmendi (1760–1814), the first native bishop of the island. He grew up and lived his life as a devout Catholic. In 1820, his older sister, Celestina Cordero, also a pious Catholic, established the first school for girls on the island.

Educator
In 1810 Cordero established a free school for all the children in his house. He taught children regardless of their race and those who could not afford an education otherwise. There, he taught reading, calligraphy, mathematics, and religious instruction. Among the distinguished alumni who attended Cordero's school were Román Baldorioty de Castro, Alejandro Tapia y Rivera and José Julián Acosta. Cordero maintained his educational center for 58 years at Luna Street. He proved that racial and economic integration could be possible and accepted.

Cordero was awarded the Premio de Virtud by the Sociedad Económica de Amigos del País en Puerto Rico, an economic club whose members were friends of Puerto Rico. He was given 100 pesos, which he, in turn, gave away to those in need. He used half of the money (50 pesos) to buy books and clothes for his students, and the other half was given to the homeless.

The people's love and respect for Cordero were evidenced by the fact that more than 2,000 people attended his funeral in 1868. The Catholic Church plans to search for Cordero's remains which were buried at the Santa María Magdalena de Pazzis Cemetery in San Juan, although the exact location is unknown.

He was a great agitator for the abolition of slavery:

Honors and veneration

Puerto Rican poet José Gualberto Padilla published a poem titled "El maestro Rafael" honoring the educator. In 1890, Rafael Cordero was immortalized in a painting titled La Escuela del Maestro Rafael Cordero by the artist Francisco Oller which can be seen in the Puerto Rican Athenaeum.

The house in Luna Street, where Rafael Cordero taught, was remodeled by the Government of Puerto Rico and is registered as a historical site in the National Register of Historic Places of the United States. There is a plaque on the outside that states the building's historical significance and its relation to him. The Puerto Rico Teachers Association annually awards the teacher who has distinguished himself or herself in the field of public or private education with the National Medal Rafael Cordero. There are various schools named after him, among them a high school in San Juan, an elementary school in Aguadilla, an elementary school in Jersey City, New Jersey, and a Junior High School in Brooklyn, New York.

In 2004, the Catholic Church, upon the request of the Archbishop of San Juan, Roberto González Nieves, O.F.M., began the process of Cordero's beatification. This is the first step on the road to possible canonization. On December 9, 2013, Pope Francis advanced the cause for Cordero when he declared that Cordero had heroically lived the Christian virtues and has been declared Venerable.

See also
 List of Puerto Ricans
 List of Puerto Ricans of African descent
 Black history in Puerto Rico

References

Further reading
Cordero's contributions to society have been documented in history books and also in the following books:

 "In search of maestro Rafael Cordero" (En busca del maestro Rafael Cordero) by Jack Delano - May 1994
 "Heroes of Puerto Rico" by Jay Nelson Tuck - March 1970

External links
 Rafael Cordero

1790 births
1868 deaths
Burials at Santa María Magdalena de Pazzis Cemetery
People from San Juan, Puerto Rico
People of colonial Puerto Rico
Puerto Rican educators
18th-century Puerto Rican people
19th-century Puerto Rican people
18th-century venerated Christians
19th-century venerated Christians
Venerated Catholics by Pope Francis
19th-century Puerto Rican educators
American venerated Catholics
Puerto Rican people of African descent
Puerto Rican Catholics